Carmara is a monotypic moth genus of the family Noctuidae. Its only species, Carmara subcervina, is found in Sri Lanka, Japan, Taiwan, Borneo and Australia. Both the genus and species were first described by Francis Walker in 1864.

Its forewings are brownish with a pale broken zigzag submarginal line. There is a pale mark on the hindmargin of hindwings.

Lepidoptera and Some Other Life Forms gives Carmara as a synonym of Nechesia Walker, 1862.

References

Moths of Asia
Moths described in 1864
Acontiinae
Monotypic moth genera